Doveton is a suburb in Melbourne, Victoria, Australia, 31 km south-east of Melbourne's Central Business District, located within the City of Casey local government area. Doveton recorded a population of 9,603 at the 2021 census.

Doveton is bounded by Dandenong Creek and Power Road in the west, the Monash Freeway in the north, Eumemmerring Creek in the east, and Princes Highway in the south.

History

Originally part of the Eumemmerring pastoral run in the 1830s, Doveton gained its name from prominent early settler and Gold Commissioner, Captain Francis Crossman Doveton, who remained until around 1903.

Named around 1954, it was transformed into a public housing estate to house the post-war population increase caused by a surge in displaced people from war torn countries and an industrial boom in Dandenong. This is disputed.

Doveton Post Office opened on 1 December 1956 as the suburb was developing and booming. An example is that when it was first opened several of the state schools and colleges had increasing enrolments and had booming popularity and growth, and this is the reason why the post office was opened – the population continued to increase.

Sometime in 1967 the first library was opened by residents, during a period when Doveton lacked any community services or facilities. Around this time Doveton gained its first council representation.

Doveton has been studied by sociology academics since the 1960s. The results of the study were published in the book 'An Australian Newtown' written by Lois Bryson and Faith Thompson in 1972. While Doveton was not specifically mentioned it is clear from the map of the area and the dates published that it is the sole subject of this book.

Attractions

A big attraction is Myuna Farm, an interactive animal farm where people can come to meet farm animals. The farm has a train for children to ride to the outer sections of the farm. It is a popular venue for children and hosts an annual Christmas carol event.

Melbourne's second largest grey-headed flying fox camp is located at the Myuna Farm wetlands. These mega-bats are important pollinators of native tree species.

The Doveton Show is held annually as a volunteer-run community event coinciding with the Melbourne Show.

Education

Schools within Doveton include two state primary schools; Doveton North P.S and Doveton Heights P.S, one Catholic primary school (Holy Family Primary School) and one Christian primary school (Maranatha Christian School) for Prep – Grade 6.

Sport

The town has 2 Australian Rules football teams Doveton football club which competes in the Outer East football competition and a team, The Doveton Eagles, competing in the Southern Football League.

Doveton Soccer Club participates in the Victorian State League Division 1 South-East and play their home games at Waratah South Reserve, Eumemmerring. Since 2016 there has also been a Doveton boxing club which affiliates with Boxing Australia.

The Doveton Steelers play rugby league in NRL Victoria.

Places of worship

Church of All Nations
St Matthews Anglican Endeavour Hills
Miracle Christian Center
Doveton Baptist Church
Doveton Mosque
The Shed
Pillars of Guidance Community Centre (PGCC)

See also
 City of Berwick – Doveton was previously within this former local government area.

References

External links
Historical 1966 Melway map of Doveton – Page 90
Historical 1966 Melway map of Doveton – Page 91
Australian Places – Doveton
Myuna Farm – City of Casey
Doveton North Primary School
Church of All Nations
Miracle Christian Center
St Matthew's Anglican Church Endeavour Hills

Suburbs of Melbourne
Suburbs of the City of Casey